Library Records is an independent record label founded in Melbourne, Australia in 1998, and focusing mainly on indie pop. It is run by Bart Cummings from The Cat's Miaow.

Artists who have released recordings on Library Records include:
 Bart & Friends
 The Cat's Miaow
 The Sound of Music
 Huon
 Other People's Children
 The Shapiros
 Sleepy Township
 Stinky Fire Engine
 Sweet William
 Tugboat

In addition, Library has released a number of compilations, including Indie Aid Abroad, to raise funds for reconstruction in East Timor, and Pacific Highway, a compilation of live recordings from the eponymous show on 3RRR.

See also 
 List of record labels

External links
  Official site

Australian independent record labels
Record labels established in 1998
Indie pop record labels